This is a listing of the horses that finished in either first, second, or third place and the number of starters in the Barbara Fritchie Handicap (1952-present), a grade 2 American Thoroughbred Sprint race at seven furlongs run on dirt at Laurel Park Racecourse in Laurel, Maryland.

In 1982, 1984 and 1985 the race was run in two separate divisions; # signifies two divisions.

†  designates an American Champion or Eclipse Award  winner.

References

External links 
Laurel Park racetrack

Laurel Park Racecourse